Crosses (stylized as †††) is the debut full-length album by the American musical group Crosses. The album was released on February 11, 2014, on Sumerian Records. The album contains remastered versions of songs from the band's previous two EPs (EP 1 and EP 2, respectively) as well as five new songs that were originally set to be released as EP 3. The album debuted at No. 26 on the Billboard 200 upon release. The album's sound reflects elements of electronic rock, nu gaze, dream pop, ambient, dark ambient, gothic rock, trip hop, dark wave, witch house and electronica.

History 
In September 2013, Crosses announced via Twitter that they were releasing their third EP on November 12 on Sumerian Records. In October 2013, Crosses announced that a full-length album was set to be released on November 26, 2013, on Sumerian, and also posted the new track "The Epilogue" online for streaming. The release date for the band's eponymous debut was later pushed back to February 11, 2014, and the new track "Bitches Brew" was posted online for streaming along with the announcement. On November 26, the date Crosses were originally scheduled to release their debut album, the band instead released a music video for "Bitches Brew", directed by Raul Gonzo. The album contains remastered versions of all songs from the previous two EPs as well as five new tracks (essentially, EP 3). The track order intermingles new tracks and songs from both EPs.

Critical reception
Upon its release, Crosses received positive reviews from music critics. At Metacritic, which assigns a normalized rating out of 100 to reviews from critics, the album received an average score of 74, which indicates "generally favorable reviews", based on nine reviews. Allmusic reviewer Gregory Heaner wrote: "††† is a solid effort that stands on its own merit rather than simply cruising on the cultural cache of its members". The Boston Globe writer Ken Capobianco stated: "The music has a cinematic feel and ominous tone, as if the band is scoring a yet-to-be-made David Fincher film". Mike Diver of Clash wrote: "As while there’s ingredients enough here to have the listener expecting something savagely tearing at the envelope of experimentalism, Crosses proves to be a most-accessible collection – perhaps the most 'pop' record Moreno has released to date". He further added that the album "meets its pre-release hype head on, and comes away the winner".

Ian Cohen of Pitchfork gave the album a mixed review, stating: "While ††† may be on the same scale as Deftones, they’re not a replacement, and it stands to reason that Moreno can ascend to the heights of their previous work. But on †††, it’s like he never had wings".

Track listing 

Note: All tracks on the album have a † symbol in their title, as substitute for the letter "T"; "Cross" is simply labelled "†".

Chart performance

Personnel 
Crosses
Chuck Doom
Shaun Lopez
Chino Moreno

Additional musicians
Duff McKagan – additional bass on "This Is a Trick"
Stephen Boettcher – mandolin assistance
Molly Carson – phone call on "Frontiers"
Chris Robyn (Far) – live drums
Mackie Jayson – drums/loop on "Nineteen Ninety Four"

Production and artwork
Eric Broyhill – mastering
Crosses – production
Brendan Dekora – assistant engineer
Shaun Lopez – production, engineering, mixing
Brooke Nipar – photography
Eric Stenman – mix engineer

References 

2014 debut albums
Crosses (band) albums
Sumerian Records albums